Baccini is an Italian surname. Notable people with the surname include:

Francesco Baccini (born 1960), Italian singer-songwriter
Ida Baccini (1850–1911), Italian writer
Maria Chiara Baccini (born 1981), former Italian female long jumper
Mario Baccini (born 1957), Italian politician

Italian-language surnames